Until 1 January 2007 Rønde municipality was a municipality (Danish, kommune) in the former Aarhus County on the east coast of the Jutland peninsula in central Denmark.  The municipality covered an area of 101 km2, and had a total population of 7,111 (2005).  Its last mayor was Vilfred Friborg Hansen, a member of the Social Democrats (Socialdemokraterne) political party. The main town and the site of its municipal council was the town of Rønde.

 Bregnet Parish
 Feldballe Parish
 Thorsager Parish

Rønde municipality ceased to exist as the result of Kommunalreformen ("The Municipality Reform" of 2007).  It was merged with Ebeltoft, Midtdjurs, and Rosenholm municipalities to form the new Syddjurs municipality.  This created a municipality with an area of 693 km2 and a total population of 40,196 (2005).  The new municipality belongs to Region Midtjylland ("Mid-Jutland Region").

References 
 Municipal statistics: NetBorger Kommunefakta, delivered from KMD aka Kommunedata (Municipal Data)
 Municipal mergers and neighbors: Eniro new municipalities map

External links 
 Syddjurs municipality's official website (Danish only)
 South Djurs tourism bureau

Former municipalities of Denmark